Motorcycle Gang originally aired on the cable television network Showtime on August 5, 1994, as part of the anthology series Rebel Highway. As with other films in the series, its name is taken from a 1950s B-movie but its plot bears no resemblance to that film.

The film was directed by John Milius, who considers it one of his favorites.

Plot
A motorcycle gang terrorizes army veteran Cal Morris and his family as they are driving on the highway to their new home in California. When the gang kidnaps Cal's daughter Leann and takes her to Mexico, Cal and his wife pursue them.

Production
When asked why he chose to remake Motorcycle Gang, Milius said "Why not? I never saw it. I just took a story that was kind of endemic to the period. What happened in those movies is that they always had a family crossing the desert and the family is beset by giant ants, cannibals or a hot rod or motorcycle gang. So in this one I have a dysfunctional family beset by a motorcycle gang."

Just before filming was to begin, the Jan. 17 Northridge earthquake interrupted shooting plans. Milius said, "We couldn't get to any of the locations since mine was by far, location-wise and production-wise, the most ambitious of all of them because it all takes place out-of-doors and in the desert. We couldn't get to any of those places, so we had to find alternate ways of doing it. I thought it was very challenging and I enjoyed the challenge a great deal."

The film was an early lead role for Jake Busey who call it "the most dynamic role I've had the opportunity to play," he says. "I grew up racing Motocross, off-road bikes. It's very dangerous. I quit when I was 17, after a good friend broke his back. I still have a bike. For the movie, I slicked back my hair like they did in the '50s, wore sunglasses and rode a Harley Davidson. This was definitely a thrilling experience."

Release
The film was the third in the series to be screened, after Roadracers and Confessions of a Sorority Girl.

References

External links

Review of film at Outlaw Vern
Review of film at AV Club

American action films
American auto racing films
Drag racing
Motorcycle racing films
Rebel Highway
1994 television films
1994 films
Films directed by John Milius
Films scored by Hummie Mann
1990s action films
Films produced by Debra Hill
Outlaw biker films
1994 crime drama films
1994 independent films
1990s gang films
American drama television films
1990s English-language films
1990s American films